Pınar is a common feminine Turkish given name. In Turkish, "Pınar" means "Spring" (of water), and/or "Fountain". Notable people called Pınar include:

Given name
Pinar Heggernes (born 1969), Turkish-born Norwegian computer scientist
Pınar İlkkaracan, Turkish human rights activist
Pınar Köksal (born 1946), female Turkish composer
Pınar Kür (born 1943), Turkish contemporary author and dramatist
Pınar Saka (born 1985), Turkish track running athlete
Pınar Selek (born 1971), Turkish sociologist
Pınar Soykan (born 1980), Turkish pop singer, actress & model
Pınar Toprak, Turkish composer
Pınar Yalçın (born 1988), Turkish-Swedish footballer

Surname
Leyla Pınar, Turkish harpsichordist and musicologist
Sedat Pınar (born 1970), Bosnian former basketball player

See also
Pınar, Dicle
Pınar Karşıyaka, Turkish professional basketball team located in Karşıyaka, İzmir
Eflatun Pınar, a spring which rises up from the ground, creating an oasis and fountain

Turkish feminine given names